Anania oberthuri is a species of moth in the family Crambidae. It is found on Corsica and Sardinia.

The wingspan is 22–23 mm.

References

Moths described in 1913
Pyraustinae
Moths of Europe